Abu Qrenat or Abu Karinat is a Bedouin village in Israel. Located in the northwestern Negev, it falls under the jurisdiction of Neve Midbar Regional Council. The village was established for the Abu Qrenat tribe from which the village receives its name.

In 2016 a trial archaeological excavation took place at the El-Ghanami Neighborhood ahead of development work. The excavation revealed intensive agricultural activity in the region, mostly from the Byzantine (4th-7th centuries CE), Mamluk and Ottoman periods (15th-19th centuries CE). The findings included poor remains of structures (including a possible open mosque), installations, dams, cave dwellings, tombs and terraces.

See also
Arab localities in Israel
Bedouin in Israel

References

Arab villages in Israel
Neve Midbar Regional Council